The Anglican Bishop of Shrewsbury is an episcopal title used by a suffragan bishop of the Church of England Diocese of Lichfield, in the Province of Canterbury, England. The title takes its name after the town of Shrewsbury in Shropshire and was first created under the Suffragan Bishops Act 1534. The Bishop of Shrewsbury has particular episcopal oversight of the parishes in the Archdeaconry of Salop. The bishops suffragan of Shrewsbury have been area bishops since the Lichfield area scheme was instituted in 1992.

The current bishop is Sarah Bullock, since her consecration on 3 July 2019.

List of bishops

References

External links
 Crockford's Clerical Directory - Listings
 Bishop of Shrewsbury's page at Lichfield Diocese